Mary Love was an American soul and gospel singer

Mary Love may also refer to:

Mary Ann Love (born 1940), American politician from Maryland
Mary Love (writer), English religious writer and biographer
Mary Love (artist) (1806–1874), Canadian artist